The 1903 season was the second season of competitive football in Norway. This page lists results from Norwegian football in 1903.

Cup

Semi-finals

|colspan="3" style="background-color:#97DEFF"|21 September 1903

|-
|colspan="3" style="background-color:#97DEFF"|22 September 1903

Final

References

External links
RSSSF Football Archive

 
Seasons in Norwegian football